Brachynema Benth. is a genus in the plant family Olacaceae. It is a Neotropical genus of 1 or 2 species of trees. Its placement is still somewhat controversial as molecular data is lacking and morphological data suggests a place outside Olacaceae and instead in Ericales

Species
 Brachynema ramiflorum Benth., Trans. Linn. Soc. London 22(2): 126. 1857 [21 Nov 1857]
 Brachynema axillare R.Duno & P.E.Berry, Novon 5(3): 238. 1995 [Autumn 1995]

References

Olacaceae
Santalales genera